Angela Finocchiaro  (born 20 November 1955, in Milan) is an Italian actress.

She won the David di Donatello for Best Supporting Actress in 2006 for her performance in The Beast in the Heart and in 2007 for her role of Amelia Benassi in My Brother Is an Only Child.

Filmography
Ratataplan (1979)
Ho fatto splash (1980)
Il burbero (1986)
It's Happening Tomorrow (1988)
Luisa, Carla, Lorenza e... le affettuose lontananze (1989)
Io, Peter Pan (1989)
Gentili signore (1989)
The Rubber Wall (1991)
The Yes Man (1991)
To Want to Fly (1991)
Acquitted for Having Committed the Deed (1992)
The Storm Is Coming (1993)
Bidoni (1995)
A che punto è la notte (1995) - TV film
Kaputt Mundi (1998)
Le madri (1999) - TV film
Don't Move (2004)
Signora (2004)
13 at a Table (2004)
The Beast in the Heart (2005)
Flying Lessons (2007)
My Brother Is an Only Child (2007)
Il cosmo sul comò (2008)
I mostri oggi (2009)
Me, Them and Lara (2010)
Benvenuti al Sud (2010)
The Santa Claus Gang (2010)
Benvenuti al Nord (2012)
Indovina chi viene a Natale? (2013)
A Boss in the Living Room (2014)
La scuola più bella del mondo (2014)
Vacanze ai Caraibi (2015)
Moana (2016) - Italian dub
Non c'è più religione (2016)
Scappo a casa (2019)
La mia banda suona il pop (2020)
''The Price of Family (2022)

External links
 

1955 births
Living people
Italian film actresses
Actresses from Milan
David di Donatello winners
Nastro d'Argento winners
Ciak d'oro winners
20th-century Italian actresses
21st-century Italian actresses
People of Sicilian descent